Pomegranate is the third solo studio album by American hip hop artist Astronautalis. It was released via Eyeball Records on September 23, 2008. Music videos were created for "Trouble Hunters" and "The Wondersmith and His Sons".

Critical reception

Cap Blackard of Consequence of Sound gave the album a grade of A+, saying, "Pomegranate is intricately constructed and diverse in its musical and lyrical make-up." Meanwhile, Jer Fairall of PopMatters gave the album 5 out of 10 stars, calling it "a portrait of a clearly talented artist who has not yet learned how to temper his innovation with the necessary discipline."

"The Story of My Life" was NPR Music's "Song of the Day" on September 23, 2008.

In 2009, Consequence of Sound placed the album at number 71 on the "Top of the Decade: The Albums" list.

Track listing

Personnel
Credits adapted from liner notes.

 Astronautalis – vocals, additional instrumentation
 John Congleton – additional instrumentation, production, programming, engineering, recording, mixing
 Sean Kirkpatrick – piano, synthesizer
 Kris Youmans – cello
 Tamara Cauble – violin
 Audrey Easley – flute, piccolo, electronic wind instrument
 Jay Jennings – trumpet
 Mckenzie Smith – drums
 Sarah Jaffe – vocals (2)
 Chris Godbey – additional programming (6, 8)
 P.O.S – vocals (12)
 Alan Douches – mastering
 Luther Himes – artwork, layout

References

Further reading

External links
 
 

2008 albums
Astronautalis albums
Eyeball Records albums
Albums produced by John Congleton